Neeraj Goyat (born 11 November 1991) is an Indian professional boxer. He won the title of "India's most promising boxer" in 2008. He is also the first professional boxer who played three fights of twelve rounds and won it. The first Indian boxer to have made it to WBC World Rankings (Ranked 20).  Also he won award of WBC Asia "Honorary Boxer of the year" in 2017. He became the only Indian boxer who's face can be seen on the WBC belt and because of him, first time Indian Flag can be seen on a WBC belt. He become first Indian who defeated china's boxer Xu Can in China itself in the year  2014, who is  World Boxing Association world champion. Neeraj was in a car accident in 2019, but has recovered and competed since.

Early life
Goyat was born in begumpur village in Karnal, Haryana. Neeraj Goyat did his Schooling till 9th standard from SD model school, Haryana. He Started boxing in 2006 in the Army sports institute and studied for 10th standard there. In the first junior national tournament held in 2007, he won the bronze medal. In the year 2008, Neeraj Goyat won the gold medal in the Youth National Tournament.

Neeraj got interested in boxing because the physique and the personality of sportsmen really appealed to him. He started with Athletics, but then when he saw boxers training around him he saw them and was really impressed with their level of fitness and strength and that's how he shifted to boxing. Since Neeraj had a very good level of fitness, he got selected in the Army sports institute in the year 2006, got very good training from the coaches there and learnt a lot from the senior boxers in the institute.

He aims at becoming the WBC World Champion and follow the footsteps of his favorite boxer Mike Tyson who is also a former WBC World Champion.

Career
Neeraj Goyat is the first Indian professional Boxer who went to Venezuela for the Olympic qualifiers before 2016 Summer Olympics and won bronze medal. He won the Award of WBC Asia ‘Honorary Boxer of the year’ 2017.

Performance in pro boxing
 3 times WBC Asia title holder.
 WBC Asian Champion 2015
 WBC Asian Champion 2016
 WBC Asian Champion 2017

Total number of Pro fights – 22
Won – 17 (7 knockouts)
Draw – 2
Lost  – 3

Performance in amateur boxing
International level achievements

 Olympic qualifiers tournament 2016 Venezuela – bronze medal 
 Youth commonwealth games 2008 – bronze medal 
 Youth world championship 2008 Mexico – participation 
 President cup Indonesia 2011 – participation 
 World military games 2011 Brazil – participation

National level achievements

 Junior national 2007 – bronze
 Youth National 2008 – gold
 All India super cup 2010 – silver 
 All India AK Mishra 2010 – gold 
 National games 2011 – silver
 Senior national 2012 – silver

Film and Television Career

Television Show on Boxing participated by Neeraj Goyat
 SFL Challengers - Telecasted in August 2012 on Zoom (TV channel).
 2013 in SFL numbered events.
 Captain of the team Haryana Warriors in Super Boxing League Season 1 - Telecasted on Sony ESPN from 7 July to 12 August 2017.

Film career
 Neeraj Goyat made his Bollywood debut with Anurag Kashyap’s film Mukkabaaz along with Deepak Tanwar.
 Ultimate Beastmaster - Telecasted in December 2017 Via Netflix.
Neeraj goyat can be seen playing role of a boxer in Toofaan movie with Farhan Akhtar which is directed by Rakeysh Omprakash Mehra.
Neeraj worked in Telugu movie RRR (film) with Ram Charan.
Neeraj worked in Telugu movie Ghani (2022 film) with Varun Tej.

References

External links
 
https://boxranking.com/boxer/view/258175

1991 births
Living people
Indian male boxers
Welterweight boxers